Madam Fredin's Eden Park School and Neighboring Row House is a registered historic building in Cincinnati, Ohio, listed in the National Register on November 29, 1979.

The building is located at 938-946 Morris Street on the southern edge of the Walnut Hills neighborhood.

Historic uses 
Single Dwelling
School

Notes

External links
Documentation from the University of Cincinnati

National Register of Historic Places in Cincinnati
Houses in Cincinnati
School buildings on the National Register of Historic Places in Ohio
Houses on the National Register of Historic Places in Ohio
Walnut Hills, Cincinnati